Uni Research Health is a department in Uni Research, one of the largest research companies in Norway. The Research Director of Uni Research Health is Professor Hege R. Eriksen.

Uni Research Health has approximately 125 employees, most of them located in Bergen, Norway.

Research units 
The research and educational activities of Uni Health are concentrated in the following research units:

 Centre for Child and Adolescent Mental Health Research
 Child Protection Research Unit
 Dental Biomaterials: Adverse Reaction Unit
 GAMUT (the Grieg Academy Music Therapy Research Centre)
 HEMIL Centre (Research Centre for Health Promotion)
 National Centre for Emergency Primary Health Care
 Occupational and Environmental Medicine
 Research Unit for General Practice in Bergen
 Research Centre for Sick Leave and Rehabilitation
 Stress, Health and Rehabilitation (formerly the Research Unit of the Norwegian Network for Back Pain)

References

External links 
 Uni Research Health
 Uni Research

Health research